Timothy Oliver Woodward (born 24 April 1953) is an English actor.

Personal life

Tim Woodward was born in Kensington, London, England, the son of actors Edward Woodward and Venetia Barrett. He was educated at Haileybury and Imperial Service College.

Career

Woodward is probably best known for his audio narration in the children's television show Wide-Eye. 

One of his earliest starring roles was as Royal Flying Corps pilot Sergeant Alan Farmer in the 1970s BBC drama Wings. This was followed by his starring as the wealthy, eccentric and by-the-book Royal Air Force pilot Squadron Leader Rex in Piece of Cake (1988).

During the 1990s Woodward made an appearance in the Granada Television soap opera Families as well as taking the role of gamekeeper Walter Gillies in Yorkshire Television's long-running 1960s drama Heartbeat.

Woodward appeared in the 2000s ITV police drama Murder City and also portrayed Leonard "Nipper" Read of Scotland Yard in the 2008 ITV adaptation of Jake Arnott's crime novel He Kills Coppers. 
He guest starred with his father Edward and son Sam as a London gangster family in a special storyline for The Bill in 2008. Also, he appeared with his father Edward in an episode of American TV's The Equalizer, where he played Robert McCall's father in a flashback scene. He is the brother of actors Peter Woodward and Sarah Woodward.

Other TV credits include: The Irish RM, Tales of the Unexpected, Pie in the Sky, Absolutely Fabulous, Prime Suspect, The Ruth Rendell Mysteries—Bribery and Corruption with James D'Arcy, New Tricks, Bramwell, Midsomer Murders, Murphy's Law, Heat of the Sun, Rosemary & Thyme and Agatha Christie's Poirot.

He had a cameo role in William Mager's short film Stiletto, completed in June 2008.

Film and television
Galileo (1975, by Joseph Losey) as Ludovico Marsili
Wings (1977, BBC television) as Sgt Alan Farmer
The Europeans (1979, by James Ivory) as Felix Young
 Cousin Phillis (1982) as  Edward Holdsworth
Tales of the Unexpected (1982) as Timothy Burton 
King David (1985, by Bruce Beresford) as Joab
Salomè (1986, by Claude d'Anna) as Nerva
Personal Services (1987, by Terry Jones) as Timms
Piece of Cake (TV series) (1988) as Squadron Leader Rex 
Closing Numbers (1993) as Keith
The Scarlet Letter (1995) as Brewster Stonehall
Some Mother's Son (1996) as Harrington
The House of Angelo (1997) as William Angelo
B. Monkey (1998, by Michael Radford) as Frank Rice
RKO 281 (1999) as Jack L. Warner
Yoho Ahoy (2000-2001) (audiobooks) - Narrator
K-19: The Widowmaker (2002) as Partonov
New Tricks (2003–04)
Wide-Eye - (2003–present) (Audiobooks) - Narrator 
Space Race (2005) as Mitrofan Nedelin
Pierrepoint The Last Hangman (2005) as the Governor of Holloway
Agatha Christie's Poirot (2006) as Enoch Arden/Charles 
Nuremberg: Nazis on Trial (2006) as John Amen
Flight of Fury (2007) as Admiral Pendleton
Stiletto (2008) as the Executive
The Fattest Man in Britain (2009) as Morley Raisin
Mad Dogs (2011) as Dominic
Fleming: The Man Who Would Be Bond (2014) as Air Chief Marshal 'Bomber' Harris
Houdini (2014) as Sheriff John
Genius (2017) as Magistrate König
Beast (2017) as Fletcher Huntingdon
The Marine 6: Close Quarters (2018) as Tommy Walker
Casualty (2019) as Vincent Millbank
Peaky Blinders (2019) as Lord Suckerby 
Radioactive (2019) as Alexandre Millerand

External links
 

1953 births
English male film actors
English male television actors
Living people
Male actors from London
People from Kensington
20th-century English male actors
21st-century English male actors
People educated at Haileybury and Imperial Service College